Golden 1 Center is an indoor arena, located in downtown Sacramento, California, United States. It sits partially on the site of the former Downtown Plaza shopping center. The publicly owned arena is part of a business and entertainment district called Downtown Commons (DoCo), which includes a $250 million 16-story mixed-use tower.

The arena, which replaced ARCO Arena as the home of the Sacramento Kings of the National Basketball Association, hosts concerts, conventions and other sporting and entertainment events. Capacity is expandable to about 19,000 to accommodate concert audiences. 34 luxury suites were sold to include all events year-round. Suite partners have access to three exclusive clubs on the premium level including two skyboxes that overlook the concourse and have a direct view of the outside. In addition to the luxury suites, there are also 48 loft-style suites.

History
As part of the successful effort to keep the Kings in Sacramento, an ownership group led by Vivek Ranadivé purchased the majority stake in the team from the Maloof family, with the city agreeing to partner with the Kings to build a new arena by 2016. Construction began October 29, 2014. Turner Construction, known in the Sacramento area for having built Terminal B at Sacramento International Airport and other projects, was the construction manager for the new arena.

The Kings' previous owners, led by the Maloof family, first proposed a downtown arena in 2012. The arena's estimated cost was $391 million. The City of Sacramento would have paid $255.5 million, the Kings would have contributed $73.25 million, and AEG was going to contribute $58.75 million.

The Kings decided to name the street leading to the front door of the arena in honor of former NBA Commissioner David Stern, whose persistent, decades-long efforts helped keep the franchise in Sacramento. Officially, the address of the Golden 1 Center is 500 David J. Stern Walk.

Financing
The Sacramento City Council voted approval of public financing and other terms on May 20, 2014. The total cost of Golden 1 Center was once estimated to be $507 million. The Sacramento Kings contributed approximately $284 million and the City of Sacramento contributed approximately $223 million. The City of Sacramento financed its contribution through the sale of bonds ($212 million) and parking and economic development funds ($11 million).

Construction costs of the new Golden 1 Center increased to $534.6 million due to a change in the seating configuration that moved hundreds of seats to the lower bowl and closer to the basketball court and additional features.

Design
Golden 1 Center reflects the fabric of Northern California by utilizing regionally sourced materials that range from glass to recycled aluminum to potentially precast concrete, composed of sand from San Benito and rocks of Sierra limestone that reflect the colors of the region. Additionally, Golden 1 Center utilizes only FSC-certified wood, an international standard of quality and responsible forest management. 

A rooftop solar array, installed by Solar Power Inc. at a cost of $2.5 million, generates up to 1.2 megawatts, augmented by an 11 megawatt solar field in nearby Rancho Seco operated by the Sacramento Municipal Utility District (SMUD). Installing solar power is part of the Sacramento Kings ownership's goal to have its new sports and entertainment center be the most technologically advanced arena in the country, and that includes being efficient and using renewable energy. The arena earned LEED Platinum certification in late September 2016.

Along with the architectural design, a number of artworks were permanently installed, with works from local artists such as Phil America and Gale Hart and internationally recognized artist Jeff Koons.

A unique fan tradition was born on the arena in 2022. For the season, 4 massive, purple-lit laser beams were installed in the grand entrance of the arena, meant to be lit everytime the Kings garnered a victory, either at home or away. The intense beams can be seen from miles away, and have received significant fan support, with the hashtag #LightTheBeam becoming popular within the Kings' social media presence after every team win.

Technology
The screens broadcast in what is known as “4K Ultra HD".

According to a Kings news release, the arena is “the world’s most connected indoor sports and entertainment venue" as the result of a multi-year deal with Comcast to provide “fully redundant transport facilities and two 100-gigabit ethernet dedicated internet circuits” at the facility. Free wi-fi connections at the arena, provided by Ruckus Networks, will be 17,000 times faster than the average home network. The connection will extend into the plaza surrounding the arena. As an example of its bandwidth, the team said the network will be able to handle more than 225,000 posts on Instagram every second.

A rooftop platform with light pipes can be programmed by local artists and used to convey events in the arena to the public through visually appealing light shows.

Naming rights
On June 16, 2015, Sacramento-based Golden 1 Credit Union acquired naming rights for the arena at a cost of $120 million over 20 years, with an average annual value at $6 million, making it one of the largest naming rights deals for a single-tenant NBA arena.

Accessibility and transportation
It is estimated that 10–15% of visitors will walk, bike or take public transportation to Golden 1 Center events{. More than 13,500 parking spaces exist within ½ mile of the arena. Sacramento Regional Transit (RT) has five light rail stations in the vicinity, with the closest at 8th & K (also known as St. Rose of Lima Park Station). The Sacramento Valley Station, located at 4th and I Streets, offers Amtrak trains, RT trains and buses, and taxi service.

Notable events

Wrestling

WWE has held multiple events at Golden 1 Center including No Mercy in 2016 and Hell in a Cell in 2019. The venue also hosts Raw and SmackDown as well.

Mixed martial arts
On December 17, 2016 UFC on Fox: VanZant vs. Waterson took place at the Golden 1 Center and marked the first MMA event held within the arena.

Bull riding
Since 2017, the Professional Bull Riders (PBR) have held an annual Built Ford Tough Series event at Golden 1 Center. Prior to 2017 the event was held at the Sleep Train Arena (an event which began in 2005).

Basketball

Professional
The Sacramento Kings began using the arena since the 2016–2017 NBA season. The Kings' first game at the arena was on October 10, 2016, against Maccabi Haifa B.C. in a preseason game, winning 135–96. Their first regular-season game at the arena was on October 27, 2016, as the Kings lost to the San Antonio Spurs, 102–94.

College
The National Collegiate Athletic Association (NCAA) announced Sacramento as a host city for the first and second rounds of the 2017 NCAA Division I men's basketball tournament on March 17 and 19, 2017. The arena will host the first and second rounds of the NCAA Division I men's basketball tournament in 2023. Sacramento was also selected to host the regionals of the NCAA Division I women's basketball tournament in 2026.

High school
The arena has been home to the California Interscholastic Federation (CIF) High School Basketball State Championships since 2017.

Concerts

Politics
The winter 2020 legislative session of the California State Legislature was conducted at the Golden 1 Center to facilitate social distancing during the COVID-19 pandemic.

References

External links
 Official Site
 City of Sacramento website
 Live Webcam pointed at Golden 1 Center
 SESC Construction cam
 Downtown Sacramento Partnership: Entertainment and Sports Complex

Sacramento, California
Basketball venues in California
Indoor arenas in California
Mixed martial arts venues in California
National Basketball Association venues
Sports venues in Sacramento, California
Sacramento Kings venues